Jean Echenoz (born 26 December 1947) is a French writer.

Biography 
Jean Echenoz was born in Orange, Vaucluse, the son of a psychiatrist, He studied in Rodez, Digne-les-Bains, Lyon, Aix-en-Provence, Marseille and Paris, where he has lived since 1970. He published his first book, Le Méridien de Greenwich in 1979, for which he received the Fénéon Prize in 1980. He has published twelve novels to date and received about ten literary prizes, including the Prix Médicis 1983 for Cherokee, the Prix Goncourt 1999 for I'm Gone (Je m'en vais), and the Aristeion Prize for Chopin's Move (Lac) (1989).

Works

Novels and narratives (récits)
 Le Méridien de Greenwich (Minuit, 1979)
 Cherokee (Minuit, 1983) (Godine, 1987; reprinted, University of Nebraska Press, 1994)
 L'Équipée malaise (Minuit, 1986) Double Jeopardy (Godine, 1993; reprinted, University of Nebraska Press, 1994)
 L'Occupation des sols (Minuit, 1988) Plan of Occupancy (Alyscamps Press, 1995) 
 Lac (Minuit, 1989) Chopin's Move (Dalkey Archive, 2004)
 Nous trois (Minuit, 1992) We Three (Dalkey Archive, 2017)
 Les Grandes Blondes (Minuit, 1995) Big Blondes (The New Press, 1997)
 Un an (Minuit, 1997)
 Je m'en vais (Minuit, 1999) US: I'm Gone (The New Press, 2001); UK: I'm Off (Harvill, 2001)
 Jérôme Lindon (Minuit, 2001)
 Au piano (Minuit, 2003) Piano (The New Press, 2004)
 Ravel (Minuit, 2006) (The New Press, 2007)
 Courir (Minuit, 2008) Running (The New Press, 2009)
 Des éclairs (Minuit, 2010) Lightning (The New Press, 2011)
 14 (Minuit, 2012) 1914 (The New Press, 2014)
 Caprice de la reine (Minuit, 2014) The Queen's Caprice (The New Press, 2015)
 Envoyée spéciale (Minuit, 2016) Special Envoy (The New Press, 2017)
 Vie de Gérard Fulmard (Minuit, 2020)

Other publications
 "Ayez des amis", p. 49-70 in "New Smyrna Beach, Semaines de Suzanne" (Minuit, 1991) 
 "J'arrive" in Le serpent à plumes, no. 3, 1992
Les Éclairs (opera, adapted from Des éclairs), Minuit, 2021

External links
Critical bibliography (Auteurs.contemporain.info)

References

1947 births
Living people
People from Orange, Vaucluse
20th-century French novelists
21st-century French novelists
Writers from Provence-Alpes-Côte d'Azur
Prix Goncourt winners
Prix Médicis winners
Prix Décembre winners
French male novelists
Prix Fénéon winners
20th-century French male writers
21st-century French male writers